Itō, Ito, Itou, Itoh or Itoo (written:  or  in hiragana) is the sixth most common Japanese surname. Notable people with the surname include:

, Japanese actress
, Japanese handball player
, Japanese manga artist
Akira Ito (disambiguation), multiple people
, Japanese comedian
Atsushi Ito (disambiguation), multiple people
, Japanese announcer
, Japanese speed skater
, Japanese actress
, Japanese voice actress
, Japanese singer, actress, dancer and model
, Japanese speed skater
, Japanese architect, architectural historian and critic
Daisuke Itō (disambiguation), multiple people
, Japanese footballer
David Ito (born 1966), Japanese comedian, actor and businessman
, Japanese writer
, Japanese singer
, Japanese cyclist
, Japanese long jumper
, Japanese motorcycle racer
, Japanese surgeon
, Japanese footballer
, Japanese swimmer
, Japanese baseball player
, Japanese rugby union player
, Japanese actor
, Japanese handball player
, Japanese baseball player
, Prime Minister of Japan in the late 19th century
, Japanese shogi player
Hiroki Ito (disambiguation), multiple people
, Japanese writer
, Japanese game producer, director and designer
, Japanese mayor
, Japanese guitarist
, Japanese character designer and animator
, Japanese swordsman
, Japanese painter
Jeremy Ito (born 1986), American football player
Jerry Ito (1927–2007), American actor
, Japanese Confucian philosopher and educator
, Japanese activist, entrepreneur and venture capitalist
, Japanese medical researcher and psychiatrist
, Japanese horror manga artist
, Japanese mixed martial artist
, Japanese baseball player
Junko Itō, American linguist
Junya Ito (disambiguation), multiple people
, Japanese badminton player
, Japanese voice actress
, Japanese singer
, Japanese women's footballer
, Japanese dancer and choreographer
, Japanese swimmer
, Japanese actress
, Japanese softball player
, Japanese footballer
, Japanese anime screenwriter and artist
, Japanese astronomer
, Japanese photographer and installation artist
, Japanese physician and biologist
, Japanese swimmer
, Japanese composer, conductor, and writer
Kenichi Itō (disambiguation), multiple people
, Japanese video game composer and musician
, Japanese footballer
, Japanese footballer
, Japanese voice actor
, Japanese jazz singer
, Japanese art director
, Japanese actress
, Japanese mathematician
, Japanese sprinter
, Japanese politician
, Japanese illustrator
, Japanese long-distance runner
Lance Ito (born 1950), American judge
, Japanese long-distance runner
, Japanese actress
, Japanese professional wrestler
, Japanese long-distance runner
, Japanese footballer
, Japanese economist
, the first official Japanese emissary to Europe
, Japanese actress, artist, model and idol
Maryanne Ito (born 1983), American musician
Mary Ito, Canadian television and radio personality
, Japanese video game artist
, Japanese cyclist
, Japanese trampolinist
Masanori Ito (disambiguation), multiple people
, Japanese neuroscientist
, Japanese World War II holdout
, Japanese businessman
, Japanese politician and Prime Minister of Japan
, also known as Hikaru Nanase, Japanese singer and composer
, Japanese synchronized swimmer
, Japanese choreographer
, Japanese figure skater
, birth name of Mika Doi, Japanese voice actress
, Japanese voice actress
, Japanese voice actor
, Japanese freestyle skier
, Japanese voice actress and singer
, Japanese table tennis player
Minoru Ito (disambiguation), multiple people
 Japanese actress and model
, Japanese voice actress
, Japanese politician
Miyoko Ito (1918–1983), American artist
, Japanese cultural anthropologist
, Japanese automotive engineer
, Japanese footballer
, Japanese ski jumper
, Japanese anime director
, Japanese writer, social critic and feminist
, Japanese manga artist
, better known as Noriko Hidaka, Japanese voice actress
, Japanese ice hockey player
Ogura Yonesuke Itoh (1870–1940), Japanese-American artist
, Japanese actress
, Japanese sculptor
, Japanese conductor
, Japanese manga artist
, Japanese actress, model and gravure idol
Robert Ito (born 1931), Canadian actor and voice actor
, Japanese footballer
, Japanese footballer
, Japanese professional wrestler
, Japanese footballer
, Japanese swimmer
, Japanese tanka poet and novelist
, Japanese softball player
, Japanese shogi player
, Japanese actress
, Japanese singer and actress
, Japanese television personality
, the real name of Project Itoh, Japanese science fiction writer and essayist
Saya Ito (born 1999), Japanese kickboxer
, Japanese announcer and television personality
, also known as Hitoshi Itō, Japanese poet, writer and translator
, Imperial Japanese Navy admiral
, Japanese painter
, Japanese voice actor
Sharon Ito (born 1960), American journalist
, Japanese table tennis player
 (born 1960), Japanese manga artist
Shin Ito (born 1964), Japanese wingsuit pilot and skydiver
Shingo Ito (disambiguation), multiple people
, Japanese motorcycle racer
, Japanese swimmer
, Japanese Buddhist
, Japanese footballer
, Japanese artist
, Japanese politician
, Japanese politician
, Japanese journalist
, Japanese actor and comedian
, Japanese voice actress and singer
, Japanese footballer
, Japanese rugby union player
, Japanese footballer
, Japanese swimmer, Japanese freestyle swimmer
, Japanese historian of science
, Japanese film director
, Japanese sport shooter
, Japanese samurai and daimyō
, Imperial Japanese Navy admiral
Susumu Ito (1919–2015), American cell biologist and soldier
, Japanese politician
, Japanese actor and voice actor
, Japanese writer
, Japanese businessman
, Japanese professional wrestler
, Japanese ski jumper
, Japanese kickboxer
, Japanese economist and academic
, Japanese manga artist
Takenori Ito, Japanese mixed martial artist
, Japanese general
, Japanese field hockey player
, Japanese rugby union player
, Japanese footballer
Takuma Ito (disambiguation), multiple people
Takuya Ito (disambiguation), multiple people
Tari Ito (born 1951), Japanese performance artist
, Japanese tennis player
Tatsuya Ito (disambiguation), multiple people
, Japanese composer
Terry Ito (born 1949), Japanese director, television producer, critic and writer
, Japanese footballer
, Japanese footballer
Tomohiko Ito (disambiguation), multiple people
, Japanese sprinter
, Japanese baseball player
, Japanese Paralympic athlete
, Japanese actor
, Imperial Japanese Navy admiral
, Japanese architect
, Japanese rower
, Japanese baseball player and manager
, Japanese politician
Willie Ito (born 1934), American animator
, Japanese classical composer
, Japanese boxer
, Japanese engineer and scientist
, Japanese photographer
, Japanese chemist
Yoshihiro Ito (disambiguation), multiple people
, Japanese sport shooter
, Japanese daimyō
, Japanese sprinter
, Japanese actor and singer
, Japanese tennis player
, Japanese politician
, Japanese footballer
Yuji Ito (fighter), Japanese mixed martial artist
Yuki Ito (disambiguation), multiple people
, Japanese footballer
, Japanese fashion model and actress
Yuna Ito (born 1983), American singer-songwriter and actress
, Japanese actor
, Japanese footballer
, Japanese footballer
Yuzuru Ito (before 1989 – 2000), quality assurance expert
, Japanese singer and guitarist

Fictional characters 
, a character in the manga series Hikaru no Go
Ayami Itō, a character in the video game Tokyo Dark
, a character in the media franchise Gakuen Heaven
, protagonist of the visual novel School Days
Satomi Ito, a character in the television series Teen Wolf
Kōsaku Itō, a character in the 2017 romantic drama film My Teacher based on the manga series of the same name

References

See also
Itō clan, a Japanese clan

Japanese-language surnames